The Galician goat is a breed of goat (Capra aegagrus hircus) of Galician origin. In 2012, there were 622 goats (514 female and 108 male) in the herd as a whole, spread across 64 farms. They are very well-adapted to their environment, and, according to Invesaga (Animal Health Research of Galicia), they have a better immune resistance to the common liver worm than other types of goat.

Geographic spread
Generally, members of this breed of goat are spread across mountainous areas, largely in the provinces of Lugo and Ourense.

Morphology

They are horned animals, of straight or concave profile, and with a great degree of sexual dimorphism. Their coat is of a single colour: mahogany or blonde, and with slight extra characterisations. In contests, it is considered a disadvantage if there are white marks on it.

See also
List of goat breeds

References

Goat breeds
Galicia (Spain)